Wrights Beach is a town in the City of Shoalhaven in New South Wales, Australia. It is on the shores of St Georges Basin, near the Jervis Bay Territory.

Demographics

Geography
Wrights Beach is located on the eastern shore of St Georges Basin, a sort of estuary. It is located southwest of Hyams Beach. To the north is Erowal Bay, to the east is Hyams Beach, to the south is located Bream Beach, to the southwest is located Cabbage Tree Point and to the southeast is located Jervis Bay Village.

References

City of Shoalhaven
Towns in New South Wales
Beaches of New South Wales